Malvika Nair is an Indian actress who appears in Telugu and Malayalam-language films. Her notable works include Black Butterfly (2013) and Cuckoo (2014).

Early life
Malvika Nair was born in Delhi. Her family soon moved to Kerala and she attended the Toc H Public School in Vyttila, Kochi, before returning to New Delhi, where she continued her studies at DAV Sreshtha Vihar. As of November 2018, she is a graduate from St Francis College for Women in Begumpet, Hyderabad.

Career
While studying, Nair modelled, appearing in various advertisements as well as the Mohan Sithara-directed music video, "Rithukkal". She subsequently began to receive acting offers and eventually entered the film industry at age 13. In her first few films she had minor supporting or cameo roles; in Ustad Hotel, she made a brief appearance in a song sequence, while in Puthiya Theerangal and Karmayodha she played the daughter of Nedumudi Venu and Mohanlal's characters, respectively. Her first major role was as Reena, a house maid who faces an acid attack, in the Malayalam drama film Black Butterfly (2013), a remake of Vazhakku Enn 18/9.

After watching her performance in Black Butterfly, Balaji Sakthivel, director of its original version, was impressed and recommended aspiring director Raju Murugan to cast her in his romantic drama film Cuckoo (2014). She portrayed an independent blind girl in the film and prior to the shoot, attended a workshop where she interacted with blind people. Pairing alongside Dinesh, Malavika portrayed Sudhanthirakodi and won critical acclaim for her portrayal. Behindwoods noted her as "effectuated excellence", while Sify.com's review stated she was "superb" and that she "lives the role". Her performance was subsequently rewarded with the Filmfare Award for Best Actress, Vijay Award for Best Debut Actress as well as the SICA Award for Best Newcomer and the Vikatan Award for Best Actress. Prior to Cuckoo, she had a Malayalam release, Pakida, in which she portrayed a fifteen-year-old girl who is sold to a brothel by her own father.

Nair next appeared in the Telugu film Yevade Subramanyam (2015) alongside Nani, with a critic noting she "shows a lot of spunk and comes up with a matured performance for a newcomer". Malavika's next release was the romantic drama, Kalyana Vaibhogame (2016), opposite Naga Shourya. It was directed by B. V. Nandini Reddy and the film was praised and her role was well appreciated. Sify wrote that "Malavika Nair who wowed the audiences with her performance in Yevade Subramanyam shines again as modern independent minded girl. She steals the show in many scenes".

In 2018, she starred as Alamelu Gemini Ganeshan in the Savitri biopic, Mahanati, directed by Nag Ashwin, which was successful at the box-office ran of 100 days.

Filmography

Television

Awards and nominations

References

External links
 
 

Indian film actresses
Actresses from Kochi
Actresses in Malayalam cinema
Actresses in Tamil cinema
Actresses in Telugu cinema
Living people
Child actresses in Malayalam cinema
Child actresses in Tamil cinema
Child actresses in Telugu cinema
Year of birth missing (living people)
21st-century Indian actresses